is a Japanese footballer currently playing as a goalkeeper for Azul Claro Numazu.

Career statistics

Club
.

Notes

References

External links

1998 births
Living people
People from Wakayama (city)
Sportspeople from Wakayama Prefecture
Association football people from Wakayama Prefecture
Japanese footballers
Association football goalkeepers
J2 League players
J3 League players
Gamba Osaka players
FC Machida Zelvia players
Fukushima United FC players
Kamatamare Sanuki players
Azul Claro Numazu players